Charles Henri Frédéric Dumont de Sainte-Croix (27 April 1758 – 8 January 1830) was a French zoologist.

A lawyer by trade, he was also an enthusiastic amateur ornithologist.  Between 1817 and 1818, he described a number of Javanese bird species discovered by Jean Baptiste Leschenault de la Tour; he also contributed articles on ornithology to the Dictionnaire des sciences naturelles, edited and published from 1816 to 1830 by F. G. Levrault.

Dumont de Sainte-Croix's daughter, Clémence married René-Primevère Lesson, a surgeon and noted French naturalist.

His younger brother, André Dumont was elected to the Convention during the French Revolution.

He was honoured in 1813, in the naming of Dumontia, which is a genus of red algae belonging to the family Dumontiaceae.

References

1758 births
1830 deaths
French ornithologists
French zoologists